Lists of ambassadors of Canada may refer to:
List of Canadian ambassadors to Afghanistan
List of Canadian ambassadors to Albania
List of Canadian ambassadors to Algeria
List of Canadian ambassadors to Angola
List of Canadian High Commissioners to Australia
List of Canadian ambassadors to Austria
List of Canadian High Commissioners to Barbados 
List of Canadian ambassadors to Burkina Faso
List of Canadian ambassadors to China
List of Canadian ambassadors to France
List of Canadian ambassadors to Germany
List of Canadian ambassadors to Israel
List of Canadian ambassadors to Japan
List of Canadian ambassadors to Mexico
List of Canadian High Commissioners to New Zealand
List of Canadian ambassadors to Romania
List of Canadian ambassadors to Syria
List of High Commissioners of Canada to Trinidad and Tobago
List of Canadian ambassadors to the United Arab Emirates
List of Canadian High Commissioners to the United Kingdom 
List of Canadian ambassadors to the United States
List of ambassadors of Canada to Russia
List of Canadian ambassadors and high commissioners to Ireland
List of ambassadors of Canada to South Korea

Multinational
List of ambassadors of Canada to the European Union
List of Permanent Representatives and Observers of Canada to the Organization of American States
List of Permanent Representatives of Canada to NATO
Permanent Representative of Canada to the United Nations

See also 
 List of Ambassadors and High Commissioners of Canada

Ambassadors of Canada
Lists of ambassadors by country of origin